Vincent Phaladi Kobola (born 8 January 1985) is a South African soccer manager and former player who is the manager of Baroka. As a player, Kobola played as a defender.

Playing career
He is a seasoned PSL player, having played local, top flight football for Moroka Swallows, Jomo Cosmos, University of Pretoria and Mpumalanga Black Aces.

Coaching career
Kobola decided to hang up his boots at the end of the 2017/18 season. On 25 August 2018, Kobola was appointed as the assistant manager of Eric Tinkler at Chippa United. In the beginning of December 2018, Tinkler was fired. A few days later, Kobola also left the club.

On 30 January 2019, Eric Tinkler became the manager of Maritzburg United, and once again, he recruited Kobola as his assistant manager. He became assistant manager at Baroka, and four games before the end of the 2021–22 season he was promoted to manager. Baroka was relegated, but Kobola stayed on as manager.

References

1985 births
Living people
People from Polokwane
Soccer players from Limpopo
South African soccer players
Association football defenders
Moroka Swallows F.C. players
Jomo Cosmos F.C. players
University of Pretoria F.C. players
Mpumalanga Black Aces F.C. players
Cape Town City F.C. (2016) players
South African Premier Division players
South African soccer managers
Baroka F.C. managers